Newport Municipal Airport  is a city-owned, public-use airport located three nautical miles (6 km) south of the central business district of Newport, a city in Lincoln County, Oregon, United States. It is included in the National Plan of Integrated Airport Systems for 2011–2015, which categorized it as a general aviation facility.

Newport Municipal formerly supported commercial passenger service with connections to Portland International Airport (PDX), but no such flights are currently scheduled. SeaPort Airlines discontinued service to Newport in July 2011. As per Federal Aviation Administration records, the airport had 1,999 passenger boardings (enplanements) in calendar year 2009 and 3,027 enplanements in 2010.

Facilities and aircraft
Newport Municipal Airport covers an area of 700 acres (283 ha) at an elevation of 160 feet (49 m) above mean sea level. It has two asphalt paved runways: 16/34 is 5,398 by 150 feet (1,645 x 46 m) and 2/20 is 3,001 by 75 feet (915 x 23 m).

For the 12-month period ending December 31, 2008, the airport had 24,027 aircraft operations, an average of 65 per day: 79% general aviation, 13% military, and 8% air taxi. At that time there were 29 aircraft based at this airport: 86% single-engine, 7% multi-engine, and 7% military.

Airlines and destinations

Cargo

References

External links 
 Airport page at City of Newport website
 Aerial image as of May 1994 from USGS The National Map
 

Airports in Lincoln County, Oregon
Newport, Oregon